Ciara Fitzgerald (born 20 August 2001) is an Australian rules footballer who played one match for the Richmond Football Club in the 2020 AFL Women's season (AFLW) after being drafted to the club with the club's 11th selection and the 87th pick overall in the 2019 AFL Women's draft. She made her debut against St Kilda at RSEA Park in round 6 2020, the club's final match of the season. At the end of the season, Fitzgerald was delisted by Richmond.

Statistics
Statistics are correct to the end of the 2020 season.

|- style="background-color: #eaeaea"
! scope="row" style="text-align:center" | 2020
|style="text-align:center;"|
| 26 || 1 || 0 || 0 || 2 || 0 || 2 || 0 || 2 || 0.0 || 0.0 || 2.0 || 0.0 || 2.0 || 0.0 || 2.0
|- 
|- class="sortbottom"
! colspan=3| Career
! 1
! 0
! 0
! 2
! 0
! 2
! 0
! 2
! 0.0
! 0.0
! 2.0
! 0.0
! 2.0
! 0.0
! 2.0
|}

References

External link 

2001 births
Living people
Richmond Football Club (AFLW) players
Australian rules footballers from Victoria (Australia)